The Washington Missourian is the Franklin County newspaper based in Washington, Missouri. The paper is owned by Missourian Publishing Company, a family-owned company. James L. Miller, Sr. purchased the paper in 1937. In addition to news stories in Washington, the paper covers the nearby cities of Union, St. Clair, and Pacific, as well as local stories from the surrounding areas. It is the most read local paper inside Franklin County and is available and read in many St. Louis County cities, such as Eureka. The paper contains obituaries from as far back as 1939.

History 
The Washington Missourian started in 1860 as the Franklin County-Gazette and received its name change in 1926. The Miller Family has owned the company since purchasing it in 1937 and delivers the newspaper bi-weekly. The combined circulation of the local newspaper is over 26,000, and the Missourian employs 135 part and full-time workers. John, Thomas, and William Miller own the Missourian Publishing Co., which prints the newspaper. William, the editor since 1957, has been at the helm for more than 40 years. The Washington Missourian has won awards, including first place awards in National Newspaper Association contests, the 1994 Missouri Gold cup award, and a General Excellence Award.

July 2012 was the 75th anniversary of ownership of the Washington Missourian by members of the James L. Miller Sr. family. The Missourian dates back to 1860. It began as the Franklin County Gazette on January 5, 1860. In April 1861, the name was changed to the Franklin County News. In April 1867, it became the Franklin County Observer. That name lasted until August 1926 when it was changed to the Washington Missourian.

Sections 
The Missourian features various sections such as Local News, Regional News, Sports, Opinion, Features, Obituaries, eMarket, Classifieds, and Business.

For their sports section, along with national and regional stories, the Washington Missourian picks a high school male and female athlete of the week(s) to feature both online and in their print newspapers.

The Miller Family 
Son Bill Sr. joined the newspaper full time in November 1953 when he returned from military duty with the Army in Korea. Before that, he had graduated from the University of Missouri with a degree in history and a minor in political science. He began as a sports editor, then became a news editor. Tom Miller joined the company in the late 1950s after college and after serving in the Army in Korea. He began in the circulation and classified ad department, then sold display ads before becoming the advertising director.

John E. Miller, another son of James L. Sr., came to the company in 1961 after college and after working at a paper company in St. Louis. He also served in the Army Reserve. He later became the commercial printing manager. Jim Miller Jr. joined The Missourian in the 1960s as the photo editor. After college and military service in Korea, he worked in classified advertising for the Kansas City Star and Times. He left the Star to sell advertising for a radio station, then for a television station. He also sold television advertising in Dallas, Texas, Buffalo, N.Y., and Indianapolis, Ind. During those years, he also worked as a freelance photographer. Jim, Jr., died in 1987.

Jim Jr.'s son, Bill Miller Sr., ran the newspaper until June 10, 2020, when he stepped down after facing backlash for publishing a racially insensitive political cartoon by Tom Stiglich. His daughters, Susan Miller Warden and Jeanne Miller Wood had resigned as owners of the company in protest earlier that day.

References

External links
 
Missourian article about U.S. Route 66 published in November 2001

Newspapers published in Missouri
Franklin County, Missouri